The Disappearing Man and Other Mysteries is a collection of mystery short stories by American author Isaac Asimov, featuring his boy detective Larry. The book was illustrated by Yoshi Miyake and was first published in hardcover by Walker & Company in 1985.

The book contains five stories. Three were reprinted from Boys' Life and the other two were new stories written for the book.

Larry appeared in six other stories, five of which appear in The Key Word and Other Mysteries. (The eleventh and final Larry story, "Zip Code," from Boys' Life September 1986, does not appear in any book.)

Contents
"The Disappearing Man" (Boys' Life, June 1978)
"Lucky Seven" (Boys' Life, September 1982)
"The Christmas Solution" (Boys' Life, December 1983)
"The Twins" (first appeared in this book)
"The Man in the Park"  (first appeared in this book)

See also
Time Machine series

References

External links

 

Mystery short story collections by Isaac Asimov
1985 short story collections
Works originally published in Boys' Life
1985 children's books
Children's mystery short story collections
American children's books